Michael Herz (born September 28, 1943) is a German businessman, co-owner of the German coffee shop and retail chain Tchibo.

Family business
In 1965, after the death of his father Max Herz, who co-founded Tchibo in 1949 with Carl Tchilinghiryan, Herz joined Tchibo as head of sales.

Tchibo is 100% owned by family members. In 2003, along with his mother and brother Wolfgang, he  bought out his other brother, Günter Herz, and sister, Daniela Herz-Schnoekel.

In 2007, the Tchibo holding company, changed its name from Tchibo Holding AG to Maxingvest AG. 

According to Forbes’ list of global billionaires, Herz is listed at number 360 with a net worth of $4.3 billion as of July 8, 2015. He was the 21st richest man in Germany and in 2003 made the top 10.

Michael Herz bought and reorganized the book wholesaler Libri and the florist Blume 2000, and he also prevented the break-up of Beiersdorf AG through his efforts. His investment in Escada turned out to be a failure and ended in bankruptcy.

Personal life
He is married and lives in Hamburg.

In 2008, his brother Joachim died in a motorboat accident.

References 

Living people
German businesspeople in retailing
20th-century German businesspeople
21st-century German businesspeople
1943 births
German billionaires
Michael
Businesspeople from Hamburg